Árpád Hajós (25 March 1902 – 23 January 1971) was a Hungarian footballer. He played in two matches for the Hungary national football team in 1923.

References

External links

1902 births
1971 deaths
Hungarian footballers
Hungary international footballers
Footballers from Budapest
Association football defenders
A.C. Reggiana 1919 players
Bologna F.C. 1909 players
A.C. Milan players
Hungarian expatriate footballers
Expatriate footballers in Italy
Hungarian football managers
Hungarian expatriate football managers
Expatriate football managers in Italy
U.S. Pistoiese 1921 managers
Taranto F.C. 1927 managers
Modena F.C. managers
Palermo F.C. managers
A.C. Cuneo 1905 managers
Novara F.C. managers
S.S. Arezzo managers
F.C. Grosseto S.S.D. managers
S.S. Juve Stabia managers
Footballers at the 1924 Summer Olympics
Olympic footballers of Hungary